"The Suburbs" is a 9-song EP released by the band  The Suburbs. It was the first record released by influential Minneapolis record label Twin/Tone.

Track listing
7" (TTR 7801)
"Memory"
"Go"
"Stereo"
"Teenage Run-in"
"Chemistry Set"
"Your Phone"
"Couldn't Care Less Anymore"
"You"
"Pre-historic Jaws"

References

External links
  The album page on the Twin/Tone website.

The Suburbs albums
1978 EPs
Twin/Tone Records EPs